Andaru Dongale Dorikite ( Everyone are Thieves when they are Caught) is a 2004 Indian Telugu-language comedy film, produced by Geo Media and directed by Nidhi Prasad. It stars Rajendra Prasad, Prabhu Deva, Kiran Rathod, Ankita and K.Nagababu , with music composed by Chakri. The movie was based on the 1997 movie Excess Baggage.

Plot
The film begins with Bujji escaping from his wedding, accompanying his maternal uncle Bangaru Raju, being afraid of the bride Chi. La.Sow Suryakantham. Both of them reach Hyderabad where Bangaru Raju meets his childhood friend C.Co. a burglar who steals cars with his gang Sivamani, Indra, Simhadri & Bipasha. Bangaru Raju & Bujji then join them.

Concurrently, a multi-millionaire KK's daughter Usha returns from abroad to learn that her father has fallen into the clutches of his swindler secretary Naveena. Once, Bangaru Raju is acquainted with Naveena and falls for her. Meanwhile, being cognizant of KK & Naveena's holiday trip when Usha plays a kidnap drama to bar them with the help of their manager Pushparaj.

But indeed he is also a fraudster who aspires to couple up with Usha. At present, Usha gives a fake call for KK and asks for Rs. 10 lakhs of ransom. Coincidentally, C.Co. & his gang arrive at the exchange spot in their context when Bangaru Raju steals the suitcase while observing the deal.

At that juncture, KK is informed that Usha is locked in her car. Eventually, Bujji mugs the car, and all at once, Naveena alerts the cops when KK assumes due to Naveena's deed they have backed up, so, he necks her out. Here, Naveena decides to take avenge, in her way back, she views the suitcase in the hands of Bangaru Raju, mistakes him for a kidnapper, and starts trapping him.

Bangaru Raju grabs her intention and double-crosses' her. Thereupon, Naveena plans for 1 crore from KK via Bangaru Raju. Soon after stopping at their lair Bujji & gang realize Usha's presence in the car trunk. So, they ask Bujji to leave her never city outskirts. Concurrently, Police begin their investigation in which Naveena & Pushparaj's plan breaks out, they even ride on C.Co's den but they all abscond and land in a forest. During the interval, Bujji & Usha fall in love on their journey. The rest of the story is a confusing kidnap drama that culminates in a happy ending.

Cast

 Rajendra Prasad as Bangaru Raju
 Prabhu Deva as Bujji
 Kiran Rathod as Naveena
 Ankita as Usha
 K. Nagababu as KK
 Brahmanandam as C.Co
 Ali
 M. S. Narayana as Truck Driver
 Mallikharjuna Rao as Sivamani
 Giri Babu as Bujji's father
 Raghu Babu as Simhadri
 Krishna Bhagavaan as Indra
 Surya as Pushparaj
 Jeeva as Khadir
 Jenny as Pushparaj's father
 Banerjee as Inspector Shyam
 G. V. Sudhakar Naidu
 Narsing Yadav
 Kishore Das as Dhaba Owner
 Junior Relangi
 Kavitha as Bujji's mother
 Kovai Sarala as Chi.La.Sow.Suryakantham
 Jyothi as Bipasa

Soundtrack 

Music composed by Chakri. Music released on Madhura Entertainments Audio Company.

References

External links 
 
 Gallery
 Andaru Dongale Dorikite At Idlebrain
 Listen Andaru Dongale Dorikite Songs
 Review at Tollywood info

2004 films
2000s Telugu-language films
Films scored by Chakri